José María de Tavira Bianchi (born September 27, 1983, in Mexico City) is a Mexican film and stage actor.

The son of Mexican theatre director Luis de Tavira and Argentine actress Rosa María Bianchi, he began acting on stage with his parents; at age seven had his first participation in an adaptation of Clotilde en su casa of Jorge Ibargüengoitia, then in 1994 participated in the work Jubileo by Jose Ramon Henríquez. Academy Award nominee Marina de Tavira is José María's cousin.

He made his film debut in The Mask of Zorro playing the main character Alejandro Murrieta (Zorro) as a child. In 2002, he has a brief stint on the Mexican film Amar te duele by Fernando Sariñana. After that he went to London, England, to study drama at Royal Holloway, University of London. 

While studying in London, he was called to do a casting for the Mexican comedy Cansada de besar sapos (Tired of Kissing Toads). He played the role of Xavier a stage actor who falls in love with Martha, played by Ana Serradilla. The film was well received by young audiences. 

He worked with Fernando Sariñana again in the film Enemigos íntimos as Mauricio co-starring Demián Bichir, Verónica Merchant, Ximena Sariñana, Dolores Heredia and Blanca Sánchez. This movie was shown at the XXIII International Film Festival in Guadalajara. 

In September 2008 the film Arráncame la vida (Tear This Heart Out), based on the novel of the Mexican writer Angeles Mastretta, got released in Mexico. In this film he played Carlos Vives, a young leader and lover of Catalina Guzmán, played by Ana Claudia Talancón. This Mexican production had a budget of 6.5 million dollars, was filmed in Puebla and Mexico City with locations in the Palace of Fine Arts and Chapultepec Castle among others. 

That same year he presented his short film 100 metros at the VI International Film Festival of Morelia. The film is an adaptation of Harold Pinter's Victoria Station and held in conjunction with his brother Julián de Tavira, both worked on the script, production and directing. 

In 2009 is starring Amar a morir as Alejandro Vizcaino. The film tells a love story amid the current disputes in Mexico. Also starring Martina García and Alberto Estrella.

In 2016 he appeared in the Mexican version of Rosario Tijeras as one of the main characters.

Filmography

Film roles

Television roles

References

External links 
 

Living people
1983 births
Male actors from Mexico City
Mexican male child actors
Mexican male film actors
Mexican male stage actors
Mexican people of Argentine descent